Tenacibaculum haliotis is a bacterium from the genus of Tenacibaculum which has been isolated from the gut of an abalone (Haliotis discus hannai) from the sea near Jeju island in Korea.

References

External links
Type strain of Tenacibaculum haliotis at BacDive -  the Bacterial Diversity Metadatabase

Flavobacteria
Bacteria described in 2017